Hunt Refining Co. was founded by oilman H.L. Hunt as an asphalt refining company in 1946.

External links

Oil companies of the United States
Companies based in Tuscaloosa, Alabama